The 2022–23 Boston College Eagles men's ice hockey season was the 101st season of play for the program and the 39th in the Hockey East conference. The Eagles represented Boston College in the 2022–23 NCAA Division I men's ice hockey season, playing their home games at Kelley Rink. They were coached by Greg Brown in his 1st season, after taking over for longtime head coach Jerry York who retired after 50 years behind an NCAA bench, 28 of which were for the Eagles.

Previous season recap
The Eagles entered the 2022–23 season following a lackluster 2021–22 campaign. With a 15–8–5 record, going 9–12–3 in conference play, the Eagles finished eighth in Hockey East and failed to secure a berth to the NCAA tournament. Despite a relatively strong start to the year in which they brought trophies home from both the Ice Breaker tournament and Ledyard Bank Classic, the Eagles suffered a 12-game winless streak to start the 2nd half of the year. During that stretch, they fell in the Beanpot opener to Northeastern and tied with Harvard for 3rd place (the first of its kind in tournament history). The postseason only saw the Eagles advance to the Quarterfinals of the Hockey East tournament; after beating New Hampshire in the Opening Round, Northeastern defeated Boston College to deny them a trip to the semi-finals.

Departures

Recruiting

Roster
As of September 1, 2022.

Standings

Schedule

|-
!colspan=12 ! style=""; | Exhibition

|-
!colspan=12 ! style=""; | Regular Season

|-
!colspan=12 ! style=""; | 

|-
!colspan=12 style=";" |

Statistics
As of March 14, 2023

Skaters

Goaltenders

Rankings

Awards and honors

Hockey East All-Stars
Cutter Gauthier, F – Third Team, All-Rookie Team

Hockey East Rookie of the Month
Cutter Gauthier, F – Month of November, Month of February

Hockey East Player of the Week
Cutter Gauthier, F – Week of December 13, 2022
Cam Burke, F – Week of January 10, 2023
Nikita Nesterenko, F – Week of February 20, 2023

Hockey East Rookie of the Week
Cutter Gauthier, F – Week of December 6, 2022, Week of January 10, 2023 (Shared with Jack Williams, Northeastern)
Andre Gasseau, F – Week of January 17, 2023 (Shared with Kristaps Skrastins, New Hampshire)

Hockey East Goalie of the Week
Mitch Benson – Week of December 6, 2022

Hockey East Defender of the Week
Lukas Gustafsson, D – Week of October 25, 2022

References

External links
BC Men's Hockey Home Page
BC Men's Hockey Page on USCHO

2022-23
Boston College Eagles
Boston College Eagles
Boston College Eagles men's ice hockey
Boston College Eagles men's ice hockey
Boston College Eagles men's ice hockey
Boston College Eagles men's ice hockey